Central Scrutinizer may refer to:
Rico Puestel
A character from the album Joe's Garage by Frank Zappa